Youth Society is the second studio album by Taiwanese Mandopop girl group S.H.E. The album was released on January 29, 2002 by HIM International Music, four months after the group's debut album, Girl's Dorm. It features S.H.E's first collaboration with Jay Chou, who composed "熱帶雨林" (Tropical Rain Forest). The song would later be performed live with Chou during the first five stops of S.H.E's Perfect 3 Tour. This album features a larger number of covers relative to Girl's Dorm, including "Remember", "給我多一點" (Give Me More), "催眠術" (Hypnotism), and "I've Never Been To Me."

The track "熱帶雨林" (Tropical Rain Forest) is listed number 4 on Hit Fm Taiwan's Hit Fm Annual Top 100 Singles Chart (Hit-Fm年度百首單曲) for 2002.

Track listing

Music videos
Similar to Girls Dorm, not all of the songs in Youth Society had music videos; the last five tracks used edited concert footage instead. S.H.E's second karaoke VCD combined the music videos from Youth Society with all four videos from Girls Dorm.

References

External links
  S.H.E discography@HIM International Music

2002 albums
S.H.E albums
HIM International Music albums